Khalwat is the name of the prayer-houses of the Druze. The primary sanctuary of the Druze is at Khalwat al-Bayada.

The Druze school of theology in Lebanon  
The Khalwat al-Bayada, Khalwet el Biyad, Khalwat al-Biyyada or White houses of communion is the central sanctuary, and theological school of the Druze, located in Lebanon. Located near Hasbaya, the khalwat is the location where Ad-Darazi is supposed to have settled and taught from during the first Druze call. It features a large, stone, circular bench next to an ancient oak tree known as Areopagus of the Elders that is secluded amongst nature and trees. The Kalwaat provides around forty hermitages for Al-ʻuqqāl (the initiated) at various times of the year. In 1838, copies of the Epistles of Wisdom were taken from the site by invading Egyptians. Visitors are politely requested to seek permission from the resident sheikh before entering the site and female visitors are requested to cover their heads as a courtesy.

See also 
 Cemevi
 Jama'at Khana
 Majlis

References

External links
 Laurence Oliphant. The land of Gilead, with excursions in the Lebanon
 Photographs of Khalwat al-Bayada and the circular bench on www.panoramio.com
 Khalwat al-Bayada on www.discoverlebanon.com

Hasbaya District
Sacred natural sites
Hermitages
Religious buildings and structures in Lebanon
History of the Druze
Druze holy places